MŽRKL League for the season 2014–15 was the fourteen season of the Adriatic League. Competition included fourteen teams from seven countries. In this season participating clubs from Serbia, Montenegro, Bosnia and Herzegovina, Croatia, Slovenia, Italy and from Macedonia. MŽRKL League for the season 2014–15 has begun to play 22 October 2014. and ended on 4 March 2015, when he it was completed a Quarterfinals. Final Four to be played from 14–15 March 2015.

As a Cadet MŽRKL League last two season a success, the Board of league decided to continue playing Cadet MŽRKL League and founded Pionir MŽRKL League. Cadet MŽRKL League comprises 12 teams, where each team plays each at once. One team is organizing a mini tournament where four teams play two rounds of the league for a weekend and so once a month. Top 4 teams qualify for the Final Four to be played in the same place for seniors and the same weekend play. Pionir MŽRKL League comprises 13 teams, where each team plays each at once. One team is organizing a mini tournament where four teams play two rounds of the league for a weekend and so once a month. Top 4 teams qualify for the Final Four to be played in the same place for seniors and the same weekend play.

Team information

Regular season
In the Regular season was played with 12 teams divided into 2 groups of 6 teams and play a dual circuit system, each with one game each at home and away. The four best teams in each group at the end of the regular season were placed in the Quarterfinals. The regular season began on 21 October 2014. and it will end on 12 February 2015.

Group A

Group B

Quarterfinals
In the quarterfinals, teams play until one team arrives first to 2 wins. The winning quarterfinalists were placed in the Final Four. The quarterfinals began on 18 February 2015. and it will end on 4 March 2015.

Final four
Final Four to be played from 14–15 March 2015. in the Dvorana Gimnazije Celje – Center in Celje, Slovenia.

Semifinals

For third place

Final

Bracket

Awards
Final Four MVP: Shannon McCallum (177-G-87) of Umana Reyer Venezia 
Player of the Year: Marica Gajić (187-C-95) of Athlete Celje 
Guard of the Year: Jovana Popović (173-PG-90) of Budućnost Volcano 
Forward of the Year: Irena Matović (186-F-88) of Budućnost Volcano 
Center of the Year: Marica Gajić (187-C-95) of Athlete Celje 
Best Young Player: Sanja Mandić (178-SG-95) of Radivoj Korać 
Defensive Player of the Year: Rebeka Abramovič (172-PG-93) of Athlete Celje 
Coach of the Year: Andrea Liberalotto of Umana Reyer Venezia 

1st Team
PG: Jovana Popović (173-PG-90) of Budućnost Volcano 
SG: Sanja Mandić (178-SG-95) of Radivoj Korać 
F: Irena Matović (186-F-88) of Budućnost Volcano 
C Ivana Tikvić (189-C-94) of Medveščak 
C: Marica Gajić (187-C-95) of Athlete Celje 

2nd Team
PG: Rebeka Abramovič (172-PG-93) of Athlete Celje 
PG: Shanasa Sanders (170-PG-89) of Budućnost Volcano 
G: Iva Borović (170-G-88) of Medveščak 
G/F: Maja Erkič (183-G/F-85) of Athlete Celje 
C: Eva Lisec (192-C-95) of Athlete Celje 

Honorable Mention
Marie Růžičková (189-C-86) of Umana Reyer Venezia 
Shannon McCallum (177-G-87) of Umana Reyer Venezia 
Ana-Marija Begić (190-C-94) of Medveščak 
Živa Zdolšek (178-F/G-89) of Triglav Kranj 
Bojana Janković (184-F-83) of Partizan 
Tamara Kapor (184-G-91) of Radivoj Korać 
Jasmina Bigović (174-G-79) of Čelik Zenica 
Anita Kelava (185-PF-97) of Trešnjevka 2009 
Haleigh Lankster (175-G-89) of Grosbasket

External links
 2014–15 MŽRKL at eurobasket.com

2014-15
2014–15 in European women's basketball leagues
2014–15 in Serbian basketball
2014–15 in Bosnia and Herzegovina basketball
2014–15 in Montenegrin basketball
2014–15 in Italian basketball
2014–15 in Slovenian basketball
2014–15 in Republic of Macedonia basketball
2014–15 in Croatian basketball